The 1994 Individual Ice Speedway World Championship was the 29th edition of the World Championship  The Championship was held as a Grand Prix series over ten rounds. 

Alexander Balashov of Russia won his first World title.

Classification

See also 
 1994 Individual Speedway World Championship in classic speedway
 1994 Team Ice Racing World Championship

References 

Ice speedway competitions
World